The Portugal national beach soccer team represents Portugal in international beach soccer competitions, and is controlled by the Portuguese Football Federation (FPF), the governing body for Portuguese football. The team has participated in 18 of the 21 editions of the Beach Soccer World Cup (organised by FIFA since 2005), and its best results are three victories in 2001 (Costa do Sauipe, Brazil), 2015 (Espinho, Portugal), and 2019 (Luque, Paraguay). Alongside Brazil, Portugal is the only team to have won the world title before and after FIFA assumed the government of beach soccer worldwide. In European competitions, Portugal is record holder of titles.

Results and fixtures

The following is a list of match results in the last 12 months, as well as any future matches that have been scheduled.

Legend

2021

Coaching staff

Current coaching staff

Coach: Mário Narciso
Assistant coach: Luís Bilro
Assistant coach: Tiago Reis

Managerial history

Mário Narciso (????–)

Team

Players

Current squad
The following players and staff members were called up for the 2021 FIFA Beach Soccer World Cup.

Head coach: Mário Narciso
1st assistant coach: Diago dos Reis
2nd assistant coach: Luis Pereira

Competitive record

FIFA Beach Soccer World Cup

Honours

FIFA Beach Soccer World Cup
Winners (2): 2015, 2019
Runners-up (1): 2005
Third place (3): 2008, 2009, 2011
Fourth place (1): 2006

Beach Soccer World Championship
Winners (1): 2001
Runners-up (2): 1999, 2002
Third place (2): 2003, 2004

Euro Beach Soccer League
Winners (8): 2002, 2007, 2008, 2010, 2015, 2019, 2020, 2021
Runners-up (10): 2000, 2001, 2004, 2005, 2006, 2009, 2013, 2016, 2017, 2022 
Third place (6): 1998, 1999, 2003, 2011, 2014, 2018

Euro Beach Soccer Cup
Winners (7): 1998, 2001, 2002, 2003, 2004, 2006, 2016
Runners-up (3): 1999, 2010, 2012
Third place (3): 2005, 2007, 2009

Mundialito
Winners (7): 2003, 2008, 2009, 2012, 2014 , 2018, 2019
Runners-up (12): 1999, 2000, 2001, 2002, 2005, 2006, 2007, 2010, 2011, 2013, 2016, 2017
Third place (1): 2022Fourth place (3): 1997, 1998, 2004

Copa Latina
Winners (1): 2000Runners-up (5): 1998, 1999, 2001, 2002, 2003Third place (1): 2005

European Games
Gold medal (1): 2019Bronze medal (1)'': 2015

References

External links
Portugal at FIFA
Portugal at BSWW
 Portugal at Beach Soccer Russia

European national beach soccer teams
Beach soccer in Portugal
Beach soccer